San Gavino or San-Gavino may refer to:

 San Gavino Monreale, a comune in the Province of South Sardinia in the Italian region Sardini
 San Gavino, a Christian saint who is greatly celebrated in Sardinia, Italy, as one of the Martyrs of Torres
 Basilica of San Gavino, a proto-Romanesque church in Porto Torres, Sardinia, Italy

San-Gavino 

 San-Gavino-d'Ampugnani, commune in the Haute-Corse department of France on the island of Corsica
 San-Gavino-di-Fiumorbo, commune in the Haute-Corse department of France on the island of Corsica
 San-Gavino-di-Carbini, commune in the Corse-du-Sud department of France on the island of Corsica
 San-Gavino-di-Tenda, commune in the Haute-Corse department of France on the island of Corsica